Jack Mills (30 March 1930 – 7 July 2001) was an Australian rules footballer who played with Carlton in the Victorian Football League (VFL).

Notes

External links 

Jack Mills's profile at Blueseum

1930 births
Carlton Football Club players
Australian rules footballers from Victoria (Australia)
South Bendigo Football Club players
2001 deaths